Women's 1 metre springboard event at the 2019 European Diving Championships was contested on 10 August. The Russian Vitaliia Koroleva, ranked at the 13th place and eliminated after the preliminary round, entered the final due to the withdrawal of Italian Elena Bertocchi (8th in the preliminaries), and managed to win the gold medal.

Results
23 athletes participated at the event; the best 12 from the preliminary round qualified for the final.

Preliminary round

Final

References

W